Marian Academy, formally known as Marian Academy Catholic Secondary School (also called Marian Academy CSS, MACSS, MA, Marian) is a Toronto Catholic District School Board facility housed in the former Humbergrove Secondary School in Toronto, Ontario, Canada. Located in the Rexdale area of the former suburb of Etobicoke, this school existed from September 1988 until June 2002. By 2001, the portion of Rexdale containing the school was the poorest part of the neighborhood.

Closure
The closing of Marian was done in order for the school board to receive additional grants from the provincial government of Ontario. Those grants would be used to rebuild Henry Carr and Monsignor Johnson. Royson wrote that "Students will have better facilities, though further away." Despite the reputation of the area of Rexdale where the school was located, the students and parents of the school said that Marian was a good school. Many students indicated that they would drop out of Marian instead of attending the new Carr.

Converting 2 Gas-Powered Cars to Electrical Power in the 90s
Students in Nick Lacoppola's automotive technology class at Marian Academy successfully converted two gas-powered cars to electrical power in the mid 90s. The students designed and built their own parts as part of this after-hours project.  The school sent a car to the 1995 APS-500 electric car race, and the students were featured in a video on how to build an electric car.  Nick Lacoppola was awarded a teaching excellence award for his work by Canada's Prime Minister.

Notable alumni
Nadia L. Hohn - Author

See also
List of high schools in Ontario

References

External links
 Marian Academy
Father Henry Carr Catholic Secondary School
TCDSB Portal

Toronto Catholic District School Board
High schools in Toronto
Education in Etobicoke
Catholic secondary schools in Ontario
Educational institutions established in 1988
Educational institutions disestablished in 2002
Bill 30 schools
1988 establishments in Ontario
2002 disestablishments in Ontario
Spiritan schools